Pedro Valentín De Pool (born February 14, 1945) is a Cuban radio personality, actor, and former television host. From 2006 until 2013, De Pool has been a part of the radio newscast team for Radio y Televisión Martí. In television, he is best remembered as the co-host of Sabado Gigante from 1986 until 1991.

Early life
De Pool was born and raised in Havana, Cuba. In 1960, at age 15, he moved to Miami, Florida and was drafted into the U.S. Army three years later.

Career
De Pool's first film role was in the 1967 Juan Orol-directed film La Virgen de la Calle. In 1982, he went on to guest-star as a master of ceremonies in an episode of the anthology series American Playhouse, and also appeared in a 1985 episode of the NBC series Miami Vice. He also had other minor roles in films such as Invasion U.S.A. (1985) and Midnight Crossing (1988).

In 1986, De Pool joined the cast of the long-running variety show Sabado Gigante on Univision, co-hosting alongside Don Francisco and Rolando Barral. Barral left the show shortly afterwards and De Pool remained the only co-host until abruptly leaving in 1991, when he was replaced by Javier Romero.

De Pool played the role Captain Mendoza in the 1988 film Midnight Crossing, and also played Adolfo in the HBO film Clinton and Nadine, which was released that same year.

From 2006 until 2013, De Pool worked as a news reporter for the internationally broadcast Radio y Televisión Martí.

Personal life
De Pool currently resides in Miami, Florida. He has two children, five grandchildren, and one great-granddaughter.

Filmography

Film

Television

References

External links
 Official Facebook Site
 

1945 births
Living people
Cuban television presenters
Cuban emigrants to the United States
American television hosts
People from Miami